The 2015 season was the Jacksonville Jaguars' 21st in the National Football League (NFL) and their third under head coach Gus Bradley. The Jaguars improved on their 3–13 record in 2014, finishing with a 5–11 record and winning their most games in a season since 2011. While they improved upon their previous two seasons, the Jaguars were eliminated from playoff contention before their Week 16 loss to the New Orleans Saints when the Houston Texans defeated the Tennessee Titans earlier in the day.

Roster changes

Notable transactions

Acquisitions
 S Sergio Brown, signed on March 11, 2015.
 CB Davon House, signed on March 11, 2015.
 DT Jared Odrick, signed on March 11, 2015.
 OT Jermey Parnell, signed on March 11, 2015.
 LB Dan Skuta, signed on March 11, 2015.
 TE Julius Thomas, signed on March 11, 2015.
 C Stefen Wisniewski, signed on April 18, 2015.

Departures 
 CB Alan Ball, became free agent on March 10, 2015. Signed on March 27 by the Chicago Bears.
 CB Will Blackmon, released on February 26, 2015. Signed on March 10 by the Seattle Seahawks.
 LB Geno Hayes, became free agent on March 10, 2015. 
 WR Cecil Shorts III, became free agent on March 10, 2015. Signed on March 16 by the Houston Texans. 
 FB Will Taʻufoʻou, became free agent on March 10, 2015. 
 LB J. T. Thomas, became free agent on March 10, 2015. Signed on March 10 by the New York Giants.
 RB Jordan Todman, became free agent on March 10, 2015. Signed on March 30 by the Carolina Panthers.

Trades
 K Josh Scobee, the Jaguars' all-time leading scorer, was traded to the Pittsburgh Steelers on August 31, 2015 for the Steelers' sixth-round selection in the 2016 NFL Draft.

Draft

Notes
 The Jaguars traded their fourth-round selection (No. 103 overall) to the New York Jets for the Jets' No. 104, and No. 229 overall draft picks.
 Fowler tore his ACL on the first day of mini-camp and missed the entirety of his rookie season.

Undrafted rookie free agents
The following is a list of notable rookie free agents signed by the Jaguars after the 2015 NFL Draft:

Staff

Final roster

Schedule

Preseason

Regular season

Note: Intra-division opponents are in bold text.
 #  Blue/Red indicates the International Series game in London.

Game summaries

Week 1: vs. Carolina Panthers

Week 2: vs. Miami Dolphins

Week 3: at New England Patriots

Week 4: at Indianapolis Colts

Week 5: at Tampa Bay Buccaneers

Week 6: vs. Houston Texans

Week 7: vs. Buffalo Bills
NFL International Series

Week 9: at New York Jets

Week 10: at Baltimore Ravens

Week 11: vs. Tennessee Titans

Week 12: vs. San Diego Chargers

Week 13: at Tennessee Titans

Week 14: vs. Indianapolis Colts

Week 15: vs. Atlanta Falcons

Week 16: at New Orleans Saints

Week 17: at Houston Texans

Standings

Division

Conference

References

External links
 

Jacksonville
Jacksonville Jaguars seasons
Jacksonville Jaguars